Supersonic Man is a 1979 Spanish superhero film directed by Juan Piquer Simón, and starring Antonio Cantafora and Cameron Mitchell.

Plot
Kronos, a humanoid extraterrestrial (Richard Yesteran), has been sent to planet Earth in order to help humanity against its own threats. Settling in New York City, he becomes a superhero, Supersonic Man. He confronts nefarious Dr. Gulik (Cameron Mitchell) who plans to take over the world.

Cast
Antonio Cantafora - Paul (credited as Michael Coby)
Cameron Mitchell - Dr. Gulik 
Diana Polakov - Patricia Morgan 
Frank Braña - Peterson 
José María Caffarel - Professor Morgan (credited as John Caffarel) 
José Luis Ayestarán - Kronos / Supersonic (credited as Richard Yesteran)

Release
Supersonic Man was distributed in Spain by Filmayer S.A. on 6 August 1979. It sold 751,696 tickets on its Spanish release.
It was the last film seen on WFLD's version of Svengoolie (titled Son of Svengoolie) before it was cancelled in 1986.
It was also spoofed by RiffTrax on October 11, 2013.

Reception
From contemporary reviews, John Pym wrote in Monthly Film Bulletin that the film "is a cut-price digest of half-a-dozen money spinners, from the Bond movies to Star Wars."

See also 
Mystery Science Theater 3000
Italo disco
The Pumaman - 1980 film similar in content

References

Sources

External links

RiffTrax preview on official YouTube channel

1979 films
1970s superhero films

Extraterrestrial superheroes
Films set in the United States
Film superheroes
1970s science fiction action films
Alien visitations in films
Spanish science fiction action films
1970s exploitation films
Spanish superhero films
1970s Spanish-language films